Velimir Ivanović (born 22 November 1978) is a Serbian former footballer who played as a midfielder.

Career
After starting out at Radnički Kragujevac, Ivanović was transferred to Greek club Larissa in 1999. He subsequently returned to his homeland and signed a four-year contract with Partizan in 2000. Failing to make an impact in just two league appearances, Ivanović was loaned to his parent club Radnički Kragujevac in the 2001 winter transfer window.

In the 2002 winter transfer window, Ivanović moved to Bulgaria and signed with Slavia Sofia. He spent four and a half seasons with the club, scoring 30 league goals in 101 league appearances.

References

External links
 
 

1978 births
Living people
Sportspeople from Kragujevac
Serbia and Montenegro footballers
Serbian footballers
Association football midfielders
FK Radnički 1923 players
Athlitiki Enosi Larissa F.C. players
FK Partizan players
Olympiacos Volos F.C. players
PFC Slavia Sofia players
PFC Spartak Varna players
PFC Minyor Pernik players
PFC Svetkavitsa players
PFC Vidima-Rakovski Sevlievo players
Second League of Serbia and Montenegro players
First League of Serbia and Montenegro players
Football League (Greece) players
First Professional Football League (Bulgaria) players
Second Professional Football League (Bulgaria) players
Serbia and Montenegro expatriate footballers
Serbian expatriate footballers
Expatriate footballers in Greece
Expatriate footballers in Bulgaria
Serbia and Montenegro expatriate sportspeople in Greece
Serbia and Montenegro expatriate sportspeople in Bulgaria
Serbian expatriate sportspeople in Bulgaria